Giannis Papantoniou (9 March 1928 – 8 January 2015) was a Greek footballer. He played in 15 matches for the Greece national football team from 1948 to 1956. He was also part of Greece's team for their qualification matches for the 1954 FIFA World Cup.

References

External links
 

1928 births
2015 deaths
Greek footballers
Greece international footballers
Place of birth missing
Association footballers not categorized by position